David Mercer (15 April 1950  26 August 2020) was a Welsh television sports presenter.

Early life 
Mercer was born in Swansea and educated at Dynevor School, at the time a state grammar school known as Dynevor Secondary Grammar School. He went on to the University of Nottingham. He played most sports at school and university, and won the Welsh junior doubles at tennis in 1968. In 1969, he was captain of the Nottingham University tennis team. He graduated in 1972 and qualified as a solicitor in 1973.

Life and career
Mercer was a partner in a large solicitors’ firm in Swansea for nine years. He became a freelance sports reporter after winning a competition organised by BBC Wales in 1979, for a time combining this work with his legal practice and with public relations duties for the Law Society. Alongside his legal career, he also stood as the Conservative candidate in the Swansea West parliamentary constituency in 1979. 

He umpired at tennis including Wimbledon from 1973 to 1984, notably the men's singles final at Wimbledon in 1984, won by John McEnroe against Jimmy Connors. Mercer began his tennis commentary career on BBC radio around 1987. From 1992, Mercer commentated on tennis for BBC Television, including the Wimbledon men's singles finals in 1999 and 2000. He was the only person to have both umpired and commentated on a Wimbledon men's singles final. He also commentated for many years for Eurosport. Mercer commentated on other sports including badminton, football, rowing, skiing, and American football.

Mercer played racquet sports like tennis, rugby, football and cricket. Later in his life, he played golf.

Personal life
Mercer lived in Wendover in Buckinghamshire, with his third wife Sue. He had one daughter, Caroline, from his first marriage, two stepchildren, Liz and Chris, and four grandchildren.

Mercer died on 26 August 2020, at the age of 70.

References

External links
 BBC biography
 Blackburn Sachs Associates client profile
 http://www.tmcentertainment.co.uk/speaker-index.html?speakerid=427&speakertypeid=14

1950 births
2020 deaths
Alumni of the University of Nottingham
People educated at Dynevor School, Swansea
People from Swansea
People from Wendover
Welsh sports broadcasters